State of Georgia may refer to:

Places
 Georgia (U.S. state), whose official name is "State of Georgia", a state of the United States of America, the Peach State
 Georgia (country), the state, nation, country of Georgia in the Caucasus, a former Soviet republic
 State of Georgia Building, Atlanta, Georgia, United States; an office building

Other uses
 Bank of the State of Georgia (1873-1917), a defunct bank in the U.S.
 , a U.S. Navy shipname
 , a Union Navy gunboat steamer of the American Civil War
 State of Georgia (TV series), 2011 U.S. animated sitcom TV show

See also

 Georgia state (disambiguation)
 Georgia (disambiguation)